The 2018–19 Football Superleague of Kosovo season, also known as the IPKO Superleague of Kosovo for sponsorship reasons with IPKO is the 20th season of top-tier football in Kosovo. The season began on 18 August 2018 and will end on 19 May 2019. A total of 12 teams are competing in the league: nine teams from the 2017–18 season and three teams from the 2017–18 First Football League of Kosovo. Drita are the defending champions from the previous season.

Teams and stadiums

Besa Pejë and Vllaznia Pozheran were relegated after finishing the previous season in eleventh and twelfth-place respectively. They will be replaced by the champions and runners-up of the 2017–18 First League, Ballkani and KEK respectively. Ferizaj defeated Vëllaznimi in play-off to claim their top-flight spot.
Note: Table lists in alphabetical order.

League table

Results
Each team plays three times against every opponent (either twice at home and once away or once at home and twice away) for a total of 33 games played each.

Matches 1–22

Matches 23–33

Relegation play-offs
The ninth and tenth-placed teams, Trepça'89 and Gjilani respectively, each paired off against the third and fourth-placed teams from the 2018–19 First Football League of Kosovo season, Vëllaznimi and Besa Pejë respectively; the two winners will play in the top-flight next season. As with previous seasons, both play-offs will be played on neutral ground.

Trepça'89 retained their spot in 2019–20 Football Superleague of Kosovo; Vëllaznimi remained in 2019–20 First Football League of Kosovo.

Gjilani retained their spot in 2019–20 Football Superleague of Kosovo; Besa Pejë remained in 2019–20 First Football League of Kosovo.

Season statistics

Scoring

Top scorers

Notes and references

Notes

References

External links
Official website

Football Superleague of Kosovo seasons
Kosovo
1